New American Press is an American not-for-profit literary press founded in 2001, and located in Milwaukee, Wisconsin, publishing poetry, fiction and nonfiction.

New American Press was founded in 2001 as part of American Distractions, an arts-support initiative in North Carolina that supported gallery shows, fringe theater events, short film viewings, and literary events. When the company disbanded in 2002, David Bowen and Okla Elliott reformed the literary arm of the company as New American Press. New American Press originally published chapbooks, and released its first full-length in 2007, a collection of lesser-known Chekhov stories, each introduced by a contemporary writer. The press publishes the winners of its national poetry and fiction competitions, as well as solicited works, both original and translated into English. The press achieved non-profit status in 2012.

Notable authors published by New American Press include Kyle Minor, Lee K. Abbott, Alden Jones, Icelandic author Olafur Gunnarsson, and Thomas E Kennedy. The press also publishes New Stories from the Midwest and New Poetry from the Midwest.

New American Press titles have been reviewed in The Star-Ledger, The Rumpus, Three Percent, The Huffington Post, Publishers Weekly, Library Journal, Kirkus Reviews, Booklist, American Book Review, and many other publications. Awards given by New American Press include the New American Fiction Prize and The New American Poetry Prize. The press is also affiliated with MAYDAY magazine, a journal of art, literature, and commentary.

New American Press authors

 Peter Filkins
 David Lloyd
 Anton Chekhov
 Stephen Haven
 Lee K. Abbott
 Duff Brenna
 Kyle Minor
 Micah Dean Hicks
 Miriam N. Kotzin
 Alden Jones
 David Armstrong
 Renée Ashley
 Margaret Rabb
 Shawn Fawson
 Brittney Scott

References

External links 
 New American Press Website
 CLMP Directory
 Inside Higher Ed
 MAYDAY magazine

Organizations based in Milwaukee
Poetry publishers
Book publishing companies of the United States